Art Bowman was a professional basketball player. He played in the National Basketball League for the Hammond Ciesar All-Americans in 1940–41 and averaged 1.1 points per game.

References 

Guards (basketball)
Hammond Ciesar All-Americans players